Hans-Jörg Hirschbühl (born 21 May 1937) is a Swiss wrestler. He competed in the men's Greco-Roman welterweight at the 1960 Summer Olympics.

References

External links
 

1937 births
Living people
Swiss male sport wrestlers
Olympic wrestlers of Switzerland
Wrestlers at the 1960 Summer Olympics
Sportspeople from Zürich